Thomas Andrew Bean (born March 13, 1953) is an American professional golfer who played on the PGA Tour and the Champions Tour.

Bean has won numerous tournaments at both the amateur and professional level. Bean won 11 PGA Tour victories, including the 1986 Byron Nelson Golf Classic, and three wins on the Champions Tour, including a 9-stroke victory at the 2008 Charles Schwab Cup Championship.

Early years
Bean was born in LaFayette, Georgia in 1953, and raised in Jekyll Island, Georgia, where his father was associated with a golf course. His family moved to Lakeland, Florida when he was 15, and his father bought a golf course there.

College career
He attended the University of Florida in Gainesville, Florida, where he became a member of the Sigma Alpha Epsilon Fraternity (Florida Upsilon Chapter) and played for coach Buster Bishop's Florida Gators men's golf team from 1972 to 1975.  While he was a Florida student, he won four amateur tournaments.  Bean and future fellow PGA Tour players Woody Blackburn, Phil Hancock and Gary Koch were members of the Gators' 1973 team that won the Southeastern Conference (SEC) and NCAA Championships.  He was a first-team All-SEC selection in 1973 and 1975, and an All-American in 1973, 1974 and 1975. He graduated from the University of Florida with a bachelor's degree in marketing in 1975, and was inducted into the University of Florida Athletic Hall of Fame as a "Gator Great" in 1978.

Professional career
Bean turned professional in 1975. He finished inside the top 35 on the money list from 1977 to 1986, a stretch that included 5 top-seven finishes on the list. His first PGA Tour victory was at the Doral-Eastern Open in 1977, and his last was at the Byron Nelson Golf Classic in 1986. In 1978 he won three times. Bean played on the United States Ryder Cup team in 1979 and 1987 and spent several weeks ranked in the top 10 of the Official World Golf Rankings in 1986 and 1987.

Bean never won a major championship but he finished second three times. He had a solo second-place finish behind Jack Nicklaus at the 1980 PGA Championship. At the 1983 British Open, Bean and Hale Irwin finished tied for second, one stroke behind Tom Watson; and in the 1989 PGA Championship Bean, Mike Reid and Curtis Strange tied for second, one stroke behind Payne Stewart.

After turning 50 years old in March 2003, Bean played on the Champions Tour, where he won for the first time at the 2006 Greater Hickory Classic at Rock Barn. In May 2008, he added a second Champions Tour title with a victory in the Regions Charity Classic. He won the season ending Charles Schwab Cup Championship in 2008 at Sonoma, California, winning by nine shots over Gene Jones with a tournament record 20 under par total.

Bean was inducted into the Florida Sports Hall of Fame in 2000.

Personal
Bean lives in Lakeland, Florida, where he enjoys hunting and fishing.  He and his wife Debbie have three grown daughters: Lauren, Lindsay, and Jordan.

Amateur wins
1974 Eastern Amateur, Falstaff Amateur
1975 Dixie Amateur, Western Amateur

Professional wins (18)

PGA Tour wins (11)

PGA Tour playoff record (3–3)

Japan Golf Tour wins (2)

Other wins (2)

Champions Tour wins (3)

Champions Tour playoff record (1–0)

Results in major championships

CUT = missed the half-way cut
WD = withdrew
"T" indicates a tie for a place

Summary

Most consecutive cuts made – 11 (1983 U.S. Open – 1985 PGA)
Longest streak of top-10s – 2 (1980 Open Championship – 1980 PGA)

Results in The Players Championship

CUT = missed the halfway cut
WD = withdrew
"T" indicates a tie for a place

See also

Fall 1975 PGA Tour Qualifying School graduates
1995 PGA Tour Qualifying School graduates
List of American Ryder Cup golfers
List of Florida Gators men's golfers on the PGA Tour
List of Sigma Alpha Epsilon members
List of University of Florida alumni
List of University of Florida Athletic Hall of Fame members

References

External links

American male golfers
Florida Gators men's golfers
PGA Tour golfers
PGA Tour Champions golfers
Ryder Cup competitors for the United States
Golfers from Georgia (U.S. state)
Golfers from Florida
People from LaFayette, Georgia
People from Glynn County, Georgia
Sportspeople from Lakeland, Florida
1953 births
Living people